Salvador Mariscal Murra (born 22 April 2003) is a Mexican footballer who plays as a defensive midfielder for Liga MX club Santos Laguna.

Club career
Mariscal started his career with Liga MX club Santos Laguna.

International career
Mariscal was called up to the under-20 team by Luis Ernesto Pérez to participate at the 2021 Revelations Cup, where Mexico won the competition. In June 2022, he was named into the final 20-man roster for the CONCACAF Under-20 Championship, in which Mexico failed to qualify for the FIFA U-20 World Cup and Olympics.

Personal life
He is the son of former football player Salvador Mariscal.

Career statistics

Club

Honours
Mexico U20
Revelations Cup: 2021, 2022

References

External links

  

2003 births
Association football midfielders
Living people
Mexican footballers
Mexico youth international footballers
Santos Laguna footballers